Lutendo Kungoane, is a South African DJ and record producer professionally known as DJ Sliqe (or simply Sliqe), he came to prominence subsequent to the release of his single "Do Like I Do" featuring Kwesta and Flabba of Skwatta Kamp.

On the 4th of June 2016 he won a South African Music Award (SAMA) for the Best Remix Category with his single "Do Like I Do (Remix)" featuring L-Tido, Riky Rick, Kwesta, Nadia Nakai, Reason and the late Flabba. He was the first local hip-hop DJ to win such an award.

In 2020, Kungoane was named head of Hip Hop and R&B at Sony Music Entertainment South Africa.

In 2020 Sliqe put out a collaborative album titled Champion Music with Maglera and 25k, the trio once again release a sequel collaborative album titled Champion Music 2 through Kennel Music under exclusive license from Sony Music Entertainment Africa.

Awards and nominations

References 

Living people
South African DJs
South African record producers
Year of birth missing (living people)